Twining Laboratories, at 2527 Fresno St. in Fresno, California, was built in 1930.  The building was listed on the National Register of Historic Places in 1991.

It was designed in Mediterranean Revival style by architect Charles E. Butner and built by contractors Fisher & McNulty to serve as a chemical testing lab.

It was modified by additions in 1935, 1942, and 1943.

References

National Register of Historic Places in Fresno County, California
Mediterranean Revival architecture in California
Buildings and structures completed in 1930
Buildings and structures in Fresno, California